The American Society for Political and Legal Philosophy (ASPLP) is a learned society founded in 1955 by political theorist Carl Friedrich.  Its aim is to bring together scholars in political science, law, and philosophy who are interested in interdisciplinary exploration of a range of problems in political and legal philosophy.  The ASPLP's main activities are to hold an annual conference, on a topic chosen in advance by the membership, and to publish the papers, along with formal commentary and invited additional essays, in Nomos, its yearbook.  As Friedrich explained in the Preface to Authority, the first yearbook: "We are calling the series NOMOS, which is the broadest Greek term for law, because in this term there are also traditionally comprised the notions of a basic political order and of customs and a way of life." He continued: "It describes reasonably well, and perhaps better than any term of modern English, what must be the focus of a society such as ours, uniting the several social sciences, law, and philosophy." That commitment to interdisciplinary normative inquiry has characterized the ASPLP and the Nomos series ever since.

Nomos, published by New York University Press from 1977 through the present, has included work by some of the leading political and legal theorists of the twentieth and twenty-first centuries, from a wide range of ideological and methodological perspectives, including Danielle Allen, Hannah Arendt, Isaiah Berlin, Jon Elster, Richard Epstein, Lon Fuller, Jean Hampton, Catharine MacKinnon, Frank I. Michelman, Robert Nozick, Martha Nussbaum, Richard Posner, John Rawls, Nancy L. Rosenblum, Judith Shklar, Cass Sunstein, Jeremy Waldron, Michael Walzer, Sheldon Wolin, and Iris Marion Young. The series was edited by Friedrich for volumes I-VIII, coedited by J. Roland Pennock and John Chapman for volumes IX-XXXI, and edited by Chapman alone for XXXI-XXXV.  Since then, series editors have included Ian Shapiro, Stephen Macedo, Melissa Williams, Sanford Levinson, James E. Fleming, and Jack Knight. In recent years, the series has been edited by Melissa Schwartzberg and, beginning in 2020, Eric Beerbohm.

Presidents
The presidency of the ASPLP rotates among the three disciplines of political science, law, and philosophy, with vice-presidents always representing the other two. The Presidents have been:

Carl J. Friedrich
Charles M. Hendel 
Lon L. Fuller
Frederick Watkins 
Richard B. Brandt 
Jerome Hall 
J. Roland Pennock 
John Rawls 
Graham Hughes
Sheldon Wolin 
John Ladd 
Paul A. Freund 
Judith N. Shklar 
Alan Gewirth 
Louis Henkin 
Dennis Frank Thompson 
Joel Feinberg 
Kent Greenawalt 
Michael Walzer 
Martha Nussbaum
Frank Michelman 
Amy Gutmann 
Will Kymlicka
Donald L. Horowitz
Nancy L. Rosenblum
Debra Satz
James E. Fleming
Stephen Macedo

Publications
The ASPLP holds an interdisciplinary conference every year, including papers by scholars from political science, philosophy, and law, on a topic chosen by the membership. It publishes those papers, along with formal commentary and invited additional essays, in NOMOS, its yearbook. The volumes in the NOMOS series, and their publishers, have been:
  
I. Authority, Harvard University Press, 1958  
II. Community  The Liberal Arts Press, 1959  
III. Responsibility, The Liberal Arts Press, 1960
IV. Liberty, Atherton Press, 1962  
V. The Public Interest, Atherton Press, 1962  
VI. Justice, Atherton Press, 1963  
VII. Rational Decision, Atherton Press, 1964  
VIII. Revolution, Atherton Press, 1966  
IX. Equality, Atherton Press, 1967  
X. Representation, Atherton Press, 1968  
XI. Voluntary Associations, Atherton Press, 1969  
XII. Political and Legal Obligation, Atherton Press, 1970  
XIII. Privacy, Atherton Press, 1971 
XIV. Coercion, Aldine-Atherton Press, 1972  
XV. The Limits of Law, Lieber-Atherton Press, 1974  
XVI. Participation in Politics, Lieber-Atherton Press, 1975 
XVII. Human Nature in Politics, New York University Press, 1977  
XVIII. Due Process, New York University Press, 1977  
XIX. Anarchism, New York University Press, 1978  
XX. Constitutionalism, New York University Press, 1979  
XXI. Compromise in Ethics, Law, and Politics, New York University Press, 1979  
XXII. Property, New York University Press, 1980  
XXIII. Human Rights, New York University Press, 1981  
XXIV. Ethics, Economics, and the Law, New York University Press, 1982  
XXV. Liberal Democracy, New York University Press, 1983  
XXVI. Marxism, New York University Press, 1983  
XXVII. Criminal Justice, New York University Press, 1985  
XXVIII. Justification, New York University Press, 1985  
XXIX. Authority Revisited, New York University Press, 1987  
XXX. Religion, Morality, and the Law, New York University Press, 1988  
XXXI. Markets and Justice, New York University Press, 1989  
XXXII. Majorities and Minorities, New York University Press, 1990  
XXXIII. Compensatory Justice, New York University Press, 1991  
XXXIV. Virtue, New York University Press, 1992  
XXXV. Democratic Community. New York University Press, 1993  
XXXVI. The Rule of Law, New York University Press, 1994  
XXXVII. Theory and Practice, New York University Press, 1995  
XXXVIII. Political Order, New York University Press, 1996  
XXXIX. Ethnicity and Group Rights, New York University Press, 1997  
XL. Integrity and Conscience, New York University Press, 1998  
XLI. Global Justice, New York University Press, 1999  
XLII. Designing Democratic Institutions, New York University Press, 2000  
XLIII. Moral and Political Education, New York University Press, 2001  
XLIV. Child, Family, and State, New York University Press, 2002 
XLV. Secession and Self-Determination, New York University Press, 2003 
XLVI. Political Exclusion and Domination, New York University Press, 2004 
XLVII. Humanitarian Intervention, New York University Press, 2005
XLVIII. Toleration and Its Limits, New York University Press, 2008
XLIX. Moral Universalism and Pluralism, New York University Press, 2008 
L. Getting to the Rule of Law, New York University Press, 2011
LI. Transitional Justice, New York University Press, 2012
LII. Evolution and Morality, New York University Press, 2012
LIII. Passions and Emotions, New York University Press, 2012
LIV. Loyalty, New York University Press, 2013
LV. Federalism and Subsidiarity, New York University Press, 2014
LVI. American Conservatism, New York University Press, 2016
LVII. Immigration, Emigration, and Migration, New York University Press, 2017 
LVIII. Wealth, New York University Press, 2017
LVIX. Compromise, New York University Press, 2018
LX. Privatization, New York University Press, 2019
LXI. Political Legitimacy, New York University Press, 2019
LXII. Protest and Dissent, New York University Press, 2020

forthcoming from New York University Press: 
LXIII. Democratic Failure, 2020
LXIV. Truth and Evidence, 2021

The volumes from 1977 (NOMOS XVII) to 2017 (NOMOS LVIII) are available on JSTOR.

References

External links
[American Society for Political and Legal Philosophy, https://political-theory.org/]

Philosophical societies in the United States
Philosophy of law